The 1924 Five Nations Championship was the tenth series of the rugby union Five Nations Championship following the inclusion of France into the Home Nations Championship. Including the previous Home Nations Championships, this was the thirty-seventh series of the annual northern hemisphere rugby union championship. Ten matches were played between 1 January and 27 March. It was contested by England, France, Ireland, Scotland and Wales.

Carston Catcheside, the England winger, became the first player to score a try against each other team in the five nations. Until the tournament became the 6 nations in 2000, only four other players managed this achievement, Johnnie Wallace (Scotland 1925), Patrick Estève (France 1983), Philippe Sella (France 1986) and Gregor Townsend (Scotland 1999).

Table

Results

External links

 Pathe News coverage of 1924 England Grand Slam

1924
Five Nations
Five Nations
Five Nations
Five Nations
Five Nations
Five Nations
Five Nations Championship
Five Nations Championship
Five Nations Championship